The Santa Lucia de' Magnoli Altarpiece (Italian: Pala di Santa Lucia de' Magnoli) is a painting by the Italian painter Domenico Veneziano, dated to around 1445–1447. Once placed at the high altar of the church of Santa Lucia dei Magnoli, Florence, it is now in the Uffizi Gallery in the same city. The large panel had originally a predella, which has been divided between museums in Washington, Berlin and Cambridge.

It has been described as "almost certainly ... the first true sacra conversazione", or painting of the Virgin and Child with saints on a unified scale and sharing the same space.

Description
The painting is one of the earliest known examples of tabula quadrata et sine civoriis as suggested by Brunelleschi, which meant a "modern" type of painting without  the inner frames and the gilded background which was typical of earlier painting. The setting is however reminiscent of the frames, with three ogival arches, the columns and the shell-shaped niches. The polychrome floor, and the architecture, including the base of the Madonna's throne, is depicted with the  use of geometrical perspective, an innovation introduced in Italian early Renaissance art. 

The saints portrayed are St. John the Baptist and St. Zenobius (patron saints of Florence), St. Lucy (titular of the church where the painting was situated) and St. Francis, who resided in the church at his arrival in Florence in 1211. The garments  and the mitre of St. Zenobius are particularly rich, with precious stones, pearls, golden plaques and enamels.

Predella

References

Sources

1445 paintings
1446 paintings
1447 paintings
Renaissance paintings
Paintings in the collection of the Uffizi
Paintings of the Madonna and Child
Paintings depicting John the Baptist
Paintings of Francis of Assisi
Paintings of Saint Lucy
Altarpieces